The 2019 Pittsburgh Panthers men's soccer team represents University of Pittsburgh during the 2019 NCAA Division I men's soccer season.  The Panthers are led by head coach Jay Vidovich, in his fourth season.  They play home games at Ambrose Urbanic Field.  This is the team's 66th season playing organized men's college soccer and their 7th playing in the Atlantic Coast Conference.

Pitt earned their first berth into the NCAA Division I Men's Soccer Tournament since 1965.

Background

The 2018 Pittsburgh men's soccer team finished the season with an 8–10–1 overall record and a 2–6–0 ACC record.  The Panthers were seeded eleventh–overall in the 2018 ACC Men's Soccer Tournament, where they upset Virginia in the first round before losing to Duke on penalties in the second round.

The Panthers were not invited to the 2018 NCAA Division I Men's Soccer Tournament.  The Panthers had one player selected in the 2019 MLS SuperDraft: Javi Pérez, by Los Angeles FC.

Player movement

Players leaving

Players arriving

Squad

Roster

Updated August 20, 2019

Team management

Source:

Schedule

Source:

|-
!colspan=6 style=""| Exhibition

|-
!colspan=6 style=""| Regular season

|-
!colspan=6 style=""| ACC Tournament

|-
!colspan=6 style=""| NCAA Tournament

Awards and honors

Rankings

References

2019
Pittsburgh Panthers
Pittsburgh Panthers
Pittsburgh Panthers men's soccer
Pittsburgh Panthers